Erwin Geschonneck (27 December 1906 – 12 March 2008) was a German actor. His biggest success occurred in the German Democratic Republic, where he was considered one of the most famous actors of the time.

Early life
Geschonneck was born in Bartenstein, East Prussia (now Bartoszyce, Poland), the son of a poor shoemaker. The family moved to Berlin in 1909 so his father could work as a nightwatchman. In 1919, the younger Geschonneck joined the Communist Party of Germany. After the Nazi takeover in 1933, he emigrated to the Soviet Union via Poland, but was expelled in 1938 and moved to Prague. After the German occupation of Bohemia and Moravia, he was arrested on 31 March 1939. During World War II, he was imprisoned in several Nazi concentration camps. In 1945, Geschonneck was one of the few prisoners who survived the RAF sinking of the Cap Arcona.

Career
Immediately following the war, Geschonneck acted in theaters in Hamburg, Germany, and made his film debut in 1947 in In jenen Tagen. He subsequently moved to East Germany, worked with Bertolt Brecht, and became a successful actor. He was a member of the jury at the 6th and 7th Moscow International Film Festivals.

Geschonneck was featured in the German film Jacob the Liar by Frank Beyer, which was nominated for Best Foreign Language Film at the 1977 Academy Awards – the only nomination for the GDR. In December 2006, he turned 100.

Geschonneck's son  directed.

Death
Geschonneck died in Berlin on 12 March 2008, aged 101.

Filmography 

 Kuhle Wampe (1932) – Arbeitersportler (uncredited)
 In Those Days (1947) – Schmitt / 6. Geschichte
 Finale (1948) – Wilke
 The Last Night (1949) – Oskar, Fahrer
 Love '47 (1949) – Kriminalbeamter
 The Beaver Coat (1949) – Motes
 Harbour Melody (1950) – Emil
 Das Kalte Herz (1950) – Holländer-Michel
 Das Beil von Wandsbek (1951) – Albert Teetjen
 Schatten über den Inseln (1952) – Dr. Sten Horn
 Die Unbesiegbaren (1953) – Wilhelm Liebknecht
 Alarm im Zirkus (1954) – Klott
 Das Stacheltier: Das Haushaltswunder (1955) – Abteilungsleiter Vogel
 Das Stacheltier: Es geht um die Wurst (1955) – Leo Weiß, Friseur
 Mutter Courage und ihre Kinder (1955, unfinished film) – Feldprediger
 Les Aventures de Till L'Espiègle (1956) – Bras d'Acier
 Der Hauptmann von Köln (1956) – Hans Karjanke
 Schlösser und Katen (1957) – Bröker
 Katzgraben (1957) – Großmann, ein Großbauer
 Der Lotterieschwede (1958) – Johan Jönsson
 Geschichte vom armen Hassan (1958) – Machmud
 SAS 181 antwortet nicht (1959)
 Musterknaben (1960) – Arthur Wedel
 Leute mit Flügeln (1960) – Bartuscheck
 Five Cartridges (1960) – Kommissar Wittig
 Ach, du fröhliche (1962) – Walter Lörke
 Wind von vorn (1962) – Schorsch
 Naked Among Wolves (1963) – Walter Kraemer
 Carbide and Sorrel (1963) – Kalle
 Tiefe Furchen (1965) – Roter Schuster
 Berlin um die Ecke (1965) – Paul Krautmann
 Geschichten jener Nacht (1967) – Willi Lenz (segment "Der grosse und der kleine Willi")
 Die Fahne von Kriwoj Rog (1967) – Otto Brosowski Sr.
 Ein Lord am Alexanderplatz (1967) – Ewald Honig
 Wir kaufen eine Feuerwehr (1970) – Herr Clasen
 Sonnensucher (1972) – Jupp König
 Tüzolto Utca 25 (1973) – Szentiványi 
 Der Untergang der Emma (1974) – Fährmann Kluge
 Jacob the Liar (1974) – Kowalski
 Looping (1975) – Bienes Vater
 Bankett für Achilles (1975) – Meister Achilles
 Das Licht auf dem Galgen (1976) – Bering
 Tambari (1977) – Luden Dassow
 Anton, der Zauberer (1978) – Vater Grubske
 Das Ding im Schloß (1979) – Prof. Bunzberger
 Circus maximus (1980) – Szakállas
 Levins Mühle (1980) – Johann
 Asta, mein Engelchen (1981) – Otto Gratzick / Hermann Gschwinder
 Der Mann von der Cap Arcona (1982) – Erwin Gregorek
 Wie die Alten sungen... (1986) – Walter Lörke
 Mensch, mein Papa...! (1988) – Erich Zarling

Television 
 Die Gewehre der Frau Carrar (1953) – Pedro
 Gewissen in Aufruhr (TV miniseries, 1961) – Oberst Joachim Ebershagen
 Der Andere neben dir (1963) – Prof. Marschner
 Asphalt-Story (1964) – Robby Assmann
 Die Ermittlung – Oratorium in 11 Gesängen (1966) – Zeuge 9
 Rendezvous mit Unbekannt (TV miniseries, 1969)
 Jeder stirbt für sich allein (TV miniseries, 1970) – Otto Quangel
 Das Geheimnis der Anden (TV miniseries, 1972) – Don Pineto / Prof. Binder
 Im Schlaraffenland (1975) – James Luis Türkheimer
 Ein altes Modell (1976) – Bruno Nakonz
 Ein Wigwam für die Störche (1976) – Opa Fritz
 Die Insel der Silberreiher (1976) – Oberst von Bülow
 Des kleinen Lokführers große Fahrt (1978) – Großvater
 Plantagenstraße 19 (1979) – Richard Matuschke
 Verlobung in Hullerbusch (1979) – Ernst / Walter Wagemühl
 Herbstzeit (1979) – Paul Wositschka
 Meschkas Enkel (1981) – Meschka
 Benno macht Geschichten (1982) – Oskar Schrader
 Das Graupenschloß (1982) – Waldemar
  (1995) – Matulla (final film role)

References

External links
 
 
 Hollywood Reporter: German film star Erwin Geschonneck dies
 International Herald Tribune: Famed East German actor, jailed by Nazis for communist sympathies, dies at 101
 New York Times: Erwin Geschonneck, Star of Many East German Films, Dies at 101 
 The Guardian: Erwin Geschonneck, A respected actor, he survived Hitler's camps to become a star in East Germany 
 Variety Magazine: Actor Erwin Geschonnek dies at 101
 Erwin Geschonneck
 "Geschonneck in Bildern" article in Berliner Zeitung

1906 births
2008 deaths
People from Bartoszyce
People from East Prussia
Communist Party of Germany members
Socialist Unity Party of Germany members
Party of Democratic Socialism (Germany) politicians
The Left (Germany) politicians
German male film actors
German male television actors
20th-century German male actors
German centenarians
Refugees from Nazi Germany in the Soviet Union
Recipients of the Patriotic Order of Merit in gold
Recipients of the National Prize of East Germany
German Film Award winners
Men centenarians